Pulkkinen is a Finnish surname, derived from the Germanic word Volk, meaning "people". Notable people with the surname include:

Aarne Pulkkinen (1915–1977), Finnish politician
Albin Pulkkinen (1875–1944), Finnish politician
Ari Pulkkinen (born 1982), Finnish musician
David Pulkkinen (born 1949), Canadian ice hockey player
Kati Pulkkinen (born 1975), Finnish cross country skier
Riikka Pulkkinen (born 1980), Finnish writer
Salomo Pulkkinen (1873–1952), Finnish politician
Teemu Pulkkinen (born 1992), Finnish ice hockey player
Tomi Pulkkinen (born 1992), Finnish figure skater 
Toni Pulkkinen (born 1990), Finnish ice hockey player
Yrjö Pulkkinen (1875–1945), Finnish politician

References

Finnish-language surnames